Nautilus Pompilius, sometimes nicknamed Nau, was an influential Soviet, and later Russian, rock band founded in Sverdlovsk in 1982 by Vyacheslav Butusov and Dmitry Umetsky. Butusov disbanded the group in 1997, after multiple successful albums and several different line-ups of the band.

Name 
The band was originally named "Ali-Baba and the Forty Thieves". In 1983, at the suggestion of the band's sound director, Andrei Makarov, the band's name was changed to Nautilus. In 1985, under the initiative of Ilya Kormiltsev, the name was lengthened to Nautilus Pompilius to avoid confusion with other Russian rock bands that were also named Nautilus at the time, such as the Moscow group led by Evgeny Margulis.

The band later elaborated on the name, saying "The band is named after the nudibranch mollusc, which is naturally beautiful and charming."  Nautilus pompilius is the scientific name of a species of cephalopod (mistakenly called a nudibranch by the band) commonly known as the Chambered Nautilus.

History

Founding 
Vyacheslav Butusov and Dmitry Umetsky took the first steps towards forming Nautilus in the late 70's. At first, the band performed at small events, covering songs by foreign performers and famous native performers like Mashina Vremeni and Voskreseniye. The band was formed by Butusov and Umetsky while the two were students in the Sverdlovsk Institute of Architecture (now called Urals Academy of Architecture).
 
In 1982, the group made its first attempts to record its own songs. The band's first album, Pereyezd (Russian: Переезд),  was released in 1983. It included some songs which had been recorded in 1982, as well as new material. The album was strongly influenced by Led Zeppelin.

Later 
The band was active in various incarnations from 1983 to 1997. Nautilus was an influential band in the post-punk, new wave wing of Russian rock music and also a landmark of the "Ural rock" style with their philosophical lyrics. Some of their early hits are popularly associated with the Perestroika period. 

The band's music was prominently featured in the 1997 movie Brother (Russian: Брат). A version of their popular song, "Bound by One Chain" ("Скованные одной цепью") appeared in the 2008 film Stilyagi. The band hired English guitarist Bill Nelson to produce their 1997 album Yablokitay, on which Nelson also plays the guitar. 

Since the group disbanded, Vyacheslav Butusov has launched a successful solo career.

Even though Butusov composed most of the band's songs and wrote some of their lyrics, poet Ilya Kormiltsev was a key contributor as a songwriter and producer.

Members

Discography

References

External links 
 Nautilus Pompilius' history at Allmusic.com
 Nautilus Pompilius at discogs.com
 Discography with Lyrics and English translations
About the band
Nautilus Pompilius On-Line - Official web site 
Zvuki.ru - Nautilus pompilius 
Official Website of Butusov & U-Piter Vyacheslav Butusov's current group (Nautilus Pompilius' front man) 

Russian rock music groups
Soviet rock music groups
Russian gothic rock groups
Russian new wave musical groups
Musical groups from Yekaterinburg